Eduard Budil (1 June 1924 – 26 February 2015) was an Austrian equestrian. He competed in the individual jumping event at the 1960 Summer Olympics.

References

External links
 

1924 births
2015 deaths
Austrian male equestrians
Olympic equestrians of Austria
Equestrians at the 1960 Summer Olympics
Sportspeople from Vienna